Dil Mom Ka Diya is a 2018 Pakistani drama serial that premiered on 28 August 2018 on ARY Digital. It is written by Saira Raza and directed by Shahid Shafat. It stars Neelam Muneer, Yasir Nawaz, Hira Mani and Imran Ashraf. It is produced by Humayun Saeed and Shehzad Nasib.

Cast
Yasir Nawaz as Afzal
Neelam Muneer as Ulfat
Hira Mani as Tamkinat
Imran Ashraf as Azhar
Alizey Shah as Farhat
Erum Akhtar as Salma; Afzal's sister
Qavi Khan as Maulvi Sahab: Ulfat and Farhat's father
Nida Mumtaz as Ulfat and Farhat's mother
Hassam Khan as Akmal; Afzal's younger brother
Zubi Majeed  as Kausar; Afzal's younger sister
Salman Faisal as Tipu

Reception 
The show received huge popularity and viewership during its broadcast. Self centred and greedy character of the Ulfat received praise from the critics and was also liked by the viewers. The most popular serial of that time received the highest TRPs of 18, which became the highest ever rating of any TV program in Pakistan. Later, this record was broke by 2019's blockbuster Mere Paas Tum Ho.

Accoldaes

References

External links

2018 Pakistani television series debuts
2018 Pakistani television series endings
ARY Digital
ARY Digital original programming
Television shows set in Karachi